The Stade Auguste-Delaune is a multi-use stadium in Reims, France. It is used mostly for football matches and hosts the home matches of Stade Reims. The stadium was one of the venues for the 2019 FIFA Women's World Cup. It hosted five group matches and one Round of 16 game.

1938 FIFA World Cup

2019 FIFA Women's World Cup

Gallery

References

External links
Stadium Guide Profile
World Stadiums Profile
Stadiumdb Profile
Soccerway Stats for the stadium

Auguste Delaune
1938 FIFA World Cup stadiums
Stade de Reims
Multi-purpose stadiums in France
Buildings and structures in Reims
Sports venues in Marne (department)
Sports venues completed in 1935
2019 FIFA Women's World Cup stadiums